Hoisești may refer to several places in Romania:

 Hoisești, a village in Dumești Commune, Iași County
 Hoisești, a village in Mărgineni Commune, Neamț County
 Hoisești (river), a tributary of the Bahlui in Iași County